Colistium is a genus of righteye flounders native to the southwest Pacific Ocean, where they occur around New Zealand.

Species
There are currently two recognized species in this genus:
 Colistium guntheri (Hutton, 1873) (New Zealand brill)
 Colistium nudipinnis (Waite, 1911) (New Zealand turbot)

References 

Pleuronectidae
Marine fish genera
Taxa named by John Roxborough Norman